Tillandsia roland-gosselinii is a species of flowering plant in the genus Tillandsia. This species is endemic to Mexico.

Cultivars
 Tillandsia 'Fireworks'
 Tillandsia 'Flagstaff'
 Tillandsia 'Madre'
 Tillandsia 'Padre'

References

BSI Cultivar Registry Retrieved 11 October 2009

roland-gosselinii
Endemic flora of Mexico